WEIS (990 AM and FM translator W263BW 100.5 FM) is an American radio station licensed to the community of Centre, Alabama.  The station serves the Gadsden, Alabama and Anniston, Alabama, area. The station is owned by Baker Enterprises, Inc.  It airs a country music format during the day and Southern Gospel music at night and all day on Sunday. In addition to its music programming, WEIS broadcasts news updates all day plus Atlanta Braves baseball, Auburn Tigers football, Alabama Crimson Tide football and daily Weiss Lake fishing reports.

The station was assigned the "WEIS" call sign by the Federal Communications Commission (FCC).

References

External links
 WEIS official website

 

Country radio stations in the United States
Southern Gospel radio stations in the United States
Cherokee County, Alabama
Radio stations established in 1964
1964 establishments in Alabama
EIS